The following elections occurred in the year 1929.

 1929 Danish Folketing election
 1929 Dutch general election
 1929 Finnish parliamentary election
 1929 Greek Senate election
 1929 Guatemalan parliamentary election
 1929 Italian general election
 1929 South African general election
 1929 South-West African legislative election
 1929 Strasbourg municipal election
 1929 United Kingdom general election

Africa
 1929 South African general election

Asia
 1929 Soviet Union legislative election

Australia
 1929 Australian federal election
 1929 Queensland state election

Europe
 1929 Czechoslovakian parliamentary election
 1929 Soviet Union legislative election

United Kingdom
 1929 Bath by-election
 1929 Bishop Auckland by-election
 1929 Eddisbury by-election
 1929 United Kingdom general election
 List of MPs elected in the 1929 United Kingdom general election
 1929 Holland with Boston by-election
 1929 Kilmarnock by-election
 1929 Liverpool Scotland by-election
 1929 Midlothian and Peebles Northern by-election
 1929 Northern Ireland general election
 1929 Preston by-election
 1929 Twickenham by-election
 1929 Wansbeck by-election

North America

Canada
 1929 Edmonton municipal election
 1929 Ontario general election
 1929 Saskatchewan general election
 1929 Toronto municipal election

Oceania

Australia
 1929 Australian federal election
 1929 Queensland state election

New Zealand
 1929 Bay of Islands by-election
 1929 Hutt by-election

See also
 :Category:1929 elections

1929
Elections